Jon-Helge Ødegård Tveita (born 22 October 1992) is a Norwegian footballer who plays as a right-back for IK Start. He has previously played for Forus og Gausel,  Stavanger IF, Viking, Bryne, Sarpsborg 08 and Brann. He made his Eliteserien debut for Viking in a 1–1 draw against Start on 20 November 2011. He was loaned out to Bryne in 2013. On 30 July 2021, he signed for IK Start.

Career statistics

References

1992 births
Living people
Sportspeople from Stavanger
Norwegian footballers
Stavanger IF players
Bryne FK players
Viking FK players
Sarpsborg 08 FF players
SK Brann players
IK Start players
Norwegian First Division players
Eliteserien players
Association football fullbacks